Venus Bay is located on Perseverance Harbour on New Zealand's subantarctic Campbell Island. It was named for an 1874 French astronomical expedition to view the Transit of Venus, which set up camp at the site. As a result of the expedition, many of Campbell Island's landforms have French names, including Mount Fizeau and Mount Dumas.

External links
The French expedition
Maps and engravings of the French camp

Geography of Campbell Island, New Zealand
Bays of the New Zealand outlying islands
Landforms of the Campbell Islands